Samuel Waterhouse (1815 – 4 March 1881) was an English Conservative Party politician who sat in the House of Commons from 1863 to 1880.

Waterhouse was the son of John Waterhouse of Wellhead and his wife Grace Elizabeth Rawson, daughter of John Rawson of Stoney Royd, near Halifax. He was a director of the Great Northern Railway. He was also a deputy lieutenant for Yorkshire and a J.P. for the West Riding of Yorkshire and a major in the 2nd West Yorkshire Yeomanry Cavalry.

In January 1860 Waterhouse stood unsuccessfully for parliament at a by-election in Pontefract. He was elected unopposed as a Member of Parliament (MP) for Pontefract at a by-election in August 1863 and held the seat until he stood down from the Commons at the 1880 general election.

Waterhouse died at the age of 65.

Waterhouse married Charlotte Lydia Edwards, daughter of Henry Lees Edwards of Pye Nest in 1840. Her brother Sir Henry Edwards, 1st Baronet was MP for Beverley.

References

External links

1815 births
1881 deaths
Conservative Party (UK) MPs for English constituencies
UK MPs 1859–1865
UK MPs 1865–1868
UK MPs 1868–1874
UK MPs 1874–1880
Deputy Lieutenants of the West Riding of Yorkshire
West Yorkshire Yeomanry officers